The 2018 European Golf Team Championships mixed team event was an event forming part of the 2018 European Golf Team Championships tournament being played in August 2018 at Gleneagles, Scotland. 11 four-player teams took part in the competition.

The event was part of the 2018 European Championships, the inaugural edition of the European Championships, a multi-sport event which is to take place in Berlin, Germany, and Glasgow, Scotland from 2 to 12 August 2018. In a surprise victory, Iceland took the title by one stroke from the Great Britain 3 team. The Sweden 2 team won bronze in the first hole of a play-off  with Spain.

Format
The European Golf Team Championships are taking place at Gleneagles in Scotland from 8−12 August 2018, featuring a 50/50 gender split in the field with male and female professionals competing for equal prize money in a men's team match play championship, a women's team match play championship, and a mixed team 18-hole foursomes stroke play championship.

The mixed team championship comprised eleven teams of four (2 men and 2 women) playing in 18-hole mixed foursomes stroke play on 11 August, with combined scores used for team's total score. Ties for medal positions were determined by sudden-death playoff involving the low-scoring foursome from each team involved.

Qualification
Qualification for the Championships was via the European Golf Team Championships points tables for men and women, which were based on men's Official World Golf Ranking points and women's Women's World Golf Rankings points earned from tournaments finishing between 10 July 2017 and 9 July 2018 with a maximum of three teams representing any one nation in each event.

Results

Bronze medal playoff

* Sweden 2 defeated Spain on the first hole of the bronze medal playoff.

References

2018 European Golf Team Championships